Poyang may refer to:

Lake Poyang, a lake in Jiangxi, China
Poyang County, a county in China
HMAS Poyang, an Australian ship

See also 
 Bo Yang (disambiguation)